Mariette Laenen (born 1 March 1950) is a former Belgian racing cyclist. She won the Belgian national road race title in 1971, 1972 and 1975.

References

External links
 

1950 births
Living people
Belgian female cyclists
People from Hulshout
Cyclists from Antwerp Province